A total solar eclipse will occur on Saturday, August 12, 2045, when the Moon passes between Earth and the Sun, thereby totally or partly obscuring the image of the Sun for a viewer on Earth. A total solar eclipse occurs when the Moon's apparent diameter is larger than the Sun's, blocking all direct sunlight, turning day into darkness. Totality occurs in a narrow path across Earth's surface, with the partial solar eclipse visible over a surrounding region thousands of kilometres wide.

In this total solar eclipse, the path of totality is not exactly the same as the August 21, 2017 total solar eclipse because the lunar node is descending and the August 2017 solar eclipse was ascending.

It will be the fourth longest eclipse of the 21st century with a magnitude of 1.0774 occurring just one hour after perigee. It will be visible throughout much of the continental United States, with a path of totality running through northern California, Nevada, Utah, Colorado, Kansas, Oklahoma, Arkansas, Mississippi, Alabama, and Florida. The total eclipse will be greatest over the Bahamas, before continuing over the Turks and Caicos Islands, Cuba, Dominican Republic, Haiti, Venezuela, Trinidad and Tobago, Guyana, Suriname, French Guiana, and Brazil.

The path of totality of this eclipse will be seen over many major cities, including Reno, Salt Lake City, Colorado Springs, Oklahoma City, Tulsa, Tampa, Orlando, Fort Lauderdale, Miami, Nassau, Santo Domingo, Belém, São Luís and Recife. It will also be the second total eclipse visible from Little Rock in 21.3 years. Totality will last for at least 6 minutes along the part of the path that starts at Camden, Alabama, crossing Florida and ending near the southernmost Bahama Islands.

This is because when a solar eclipse crosses the U.S. in mid-August at an ascending node (i.e. moves from south to north during odd-numbered saros), the path of the eclipse tracks from coast to coast. When a solar eclipse crosses the U.S. in mid-August at descending node (even numbered saros), the path tracks a large distance southward.

Images 
Animated path: Small dark circle represents umbra, much larger grey circle represents penumbra.

Related eclipses

Solar eclipses of 2044–2047

Saros 136

Tritos series

Metonic series

See also
Notable total solar eclipse crossing the United States from 1900 to 2050:
 Solar eclipse of June 8, 1918
 Solar eclipse of August 21, 2017
 Solar eclipse of April 8, 2024
 Solar eclipse of August 12, 2045

Notable annular solar eclipse crossing the United States from 1900 to 2050:
 Solar eclipse of September 1, 1951
 Solar eclipse of May 30, 1984
 Solar eclipse of May 10, 1994
 Solar eclipse of October 14, 2023
 Solar eclipse of June 11, 2048

References

External links 
 http://eclipse.gsfc.nasa.gov/SEplot/SEplot2001/SE2045Aug12T.GIF

2045 in science
2045 08 12
2045 08 12
2045 08 12